Georg Nigl (born 1972) is an Austrian baritone in opera and concert, and a professor of voice at the State University of Music and Performing Arts Stuttgart. Performing internationally, he is known for roles in contemporary operas, such as creating the title role in Pascal Dusapin's Faustus, the Last Night at the Berlin State Opera. He names as his favourite roles Monteverdi's Orfeo, Mozart's Papageno and Alban Berg's Wozzeck.

Career 
Born in Vienna, Nigl was a soprano soloist with the Wiener Sängerknaben. He completed his studies with Kammersängerin Hilde Zadek.

Nigl created the title role in Pascal Dusapin's opera Faustus, the Last Night at the Berlin State Opera, and participated in premieres of music by Friedrich Cerha, HK Gruber, Georg Friedrich Haas, Wolfgang Mitterer, Olga Neuwirth and Salvatore Sciarrino. He made his debut at the Salzburg Festival in 2006 as Saretzki in Tchaikovsky's Eugen Onegin. He names as his favourite roles Monteverdi's Orfeo, Mozart's Pagageno and Alban Berg's Wozzeck.

Nigl appeared as Wozzeck both at La Scala and the Bolshoi Theatre. He performed the title role of Wolfgang Rihm's Jakob Lenz at the Wiener Festwochen, and the role of Lui in the premiere of Dusapin's Passione at the Aix-en-Provence Festival. In 2010, he appeared in the title role of Rihm's Dionysos at the Dutch National Opera in Amsterdam, and in the title role, the Devil, of Die Tragödie des Teufels by Péter Eötvös at the Bavarian State Opera.

In recital, Nigl has collaborated with Alexander Melnikov and Andreas Staier, among others, performing worldwide.

Nigl has been a professor of voice at the State University of Music and Performing Arts Stuttgart.

References

External links 
 Georg Nigl operabase.com
 
 Georg Nigl Impresariat Simmenauer
 Georg Nigl (Baritone) Bach Cantatas Website
 
 

Austrian operatic baritones
Austrian academics
Voice teachers
1972 births
Living people
Musicians from Vienna
University of Music and Performing Arts Vienna alumni
Academic staff of the State University of Music and Performing Arts Stuttgart
21st-century Austrian male opera singers